In probability theory, an intensity measure is a measure that is derived from a random measure. The intensity measure is a non-random measure and is defined as the expectation value of the random measure of a set, hence it corresponds to the average volume the random measure assigns to a set. The intensity measure contains important information about the properties of the random measure. A Poisson point process, interpreted as a random measure, is for example uniquely determined by its intensity measure.

Definition 

The intensity measure 

for all . 

Properties 
The intensity measure  is always  s-finite and satisfies

References 

Measures (measure theory)
Probability theory